There are nine stadiums in use by Florida State League baseball teams, all located in Florida. The oldest stadium is Jackie Robinson Ballpark (1914) in Daytona Beach, home of the Daytona Tortugas. The newest stadium is BayCare Ballpark (2004) in Clearwater, home of the Clearwater Threshers. One stadium was built in each of the 1910s, 1920s, 1960s, and 1980s, four in the 1990s, and one in the 2000s. The highest seating capacity is 11,026 at George M. Steinbrenner Field in Tampa, where the Tampa Tarpons play. The lowest capacity is 4,200 at Jackie Robinson Ballpark.

Stadiums and Map

Gallery

See also

List of Single-A baseball stadiums
List of California League stadiums
List of Carolina League stadiums

References

General reference

External links

Florida State League
Florida State League stadiums
 
Florida State League stadiums